Fadia Ahmad (born 1975) is a Spanish-Lebanese photographer, artist, and filmmaker.   

Her practice focuses largely on creating narratives through her photography. She has created several series of portraits and landscapes, particularly in Africa, the Middle East and Asia. Engaged in humanitarian issues, she released two series of photographs and films about refugees in Lebanon entitled It Could Be You.

Background 
Ahmad was born in Alicante, Spain to Lebanese parents who fled the Lebanese Civil War in the 1970s. In 1991, she returned to Lebanon and attended university at the L'Institut d'études scéniques, audiovisuelles et cinématographiques (IESAV) in Beirut. In addition to studying filmmaking and cinematography, she took courses in photography.

Selected projects 

Ahmad's most recent project is Beyrouth/Beirut (2019), an homage to the urban environment, complex demographics, and nostalgic architecture of Lebanon's capital. To complete this photo series, Ahmad walked a daily itinerary of 10,452 steps across the capital city from the neighborhood of Mar Mikhael to the Sporting Club, a social fixture located in the neighborhood of Raouché. The number of steps mirrors the square footage of the Lebanese national territory, indicating Beirut as a microcosm representing the entire country. This project exemplifies Ahmad’s interest in and connection to, her homeland, particularly in the patchwork composition of Beirut, and, more broadly, her desire to address ongoing changes in the fabric of the city over the last decade. The project is divided into sections including urban geography, the train station or the lost time, architectural contrasts of past and present, the communities, street life, the fishermen and the seaside promenade and the Corniche.

Beyrouth/Beirut was originally intended as a traveling exhibition. Its first destination was Beit Beirut in 2019, a historic house museum built in 1924 located on the historic Green Line (Lebanon) which separated East and West Beirut during the Lebanese Civil War. The exhibition was later staged at the Jordan National Gallery of Fine Arts in Amman.

In August 2021, Ahmad was a judge on Season 2 of the World Art Collector Incubator, a series dedicated to Lebanese artists launched on YouTube. The mission statement of the program aims to highlight and promote both established and promising artists.

Beirut, the Aftermath 
In the wake of the 2020 Beirut Explosion on August 4, Ahmad started filming a documentary, based on Beyrouth/Beirut, that examines the local population, historical architecture, and daily life the aftermath of the blast. It features interviews with a wide gamut of individuals who bore witness to the tragic event. Of the documentary, the filmmaker said:"The news showed the blast and its aftermath, but not the psychological impact it had on Beirut’s residents; it was important for me to bring forth how huge the psychological impact of that blast was. People have so much to say, but they never had a chance to say it. The audience will notice the documentary will seem to end at different instances. This symbolizes our never-ending story. There is no defined beginning, no defined end. We are a people perpetually on the cusp of death. Every time we think it’s the end, we continue."Beirut, the Aftermath, Ahmad's first feature documentary film was launched in 2021. The film was featured in many film festivals and she won a number of awards including 2nd place in the Short Films category at the Lebanese Film Festival in Canada and four awards at the Five Continents International Film Festival 2021 in Venezuela.

Awards and festivals 
 The Lebanese Canadian Film Festival in Canada 2021 - Official Selection and 2nd Place Award Winner Feature Film Documentary 
 The Lebanese Canadian Film Festival screening “Beirut the Aftermath” at Cinema Guzzo, Cote Vertu, Montreal, Canada
 Rabat International Author Film Festival - Official Selection 
 Argenteuil International Film Festival 2021 - July Edition Winner
 Five Continents International Film Festival 2021 - Official Selection and four awards: Best Documentary Half-Length Film, Best Female Director Feature Film, Special Mention Production Feature Film, Best Poster.
 Five Continents International Film Festival 2021 - Official Selection and four awards: Best Documentary Half-Length Film, Best Female Director Feature Film, Special Mention Production Feature Film, and Best Poster.
 ‘Dessine-moi un cèdre’: Hymne Au Liban’ Exhibition, November 25 to 27, Galerie Modus, Paris.
 Judge of Season 2 of World Art Collector Incubator, 2021
 SR Socially Relevant Film Festival in New York - Official Selection.
 SR Socially Relevant Film Festival Talk - Meet the Filmmakers.
 SR Socially Relevant Film Festival Talk - Meet the WOMEN Filmmakers.
 From Peoria to Lebanon Exhibition, November 30, 2021 to January 9, 2022, Peoria Riverfront Museum.
 "When life hangs by a thread", Closing Exhibition, March 1 to 31, 2022, Expo 2020 Dubai.
 Film Screening, Duke University, Griffith Theater, March 29, 2022.

References

External links 

 Official website
 The Patwalk Interview
 Instagram page

21st-century Lebanese women
Lebanese women film producers
People from Valencia
Lebanese women photographers
Living people
1975 births
Lebanese photographers
Lebanese filmmakers